Babica may refer to the following places:

 Babica, Lesser Poland Voivodeship, Poland
 Babica, Podkarpackie Voivodeship, Poland
 Babica (Kuršumlija), a community in Serbia